Edwin S. Hinckley (July 21, 1868 – November 15, 1929) was one of only two men to hold the position of counselor to the president of Brigham Young University.  He was a prominent educator and geologist.

Biography
Hinckley was the son of Ira N. Hinckley and one of his wives, Adelaide.  He was born at Cove Fort, Utah.  He attended Brigham Young Academy and graduated from both its high school and collegiate divisions.  He joined the BYA faculty in 1895.

In 1890 Hinckley married Adeline Henry.  During his time at the University of Michigan they took in boarders to make ends meet.

He pursued higher education at the University of Michigan and also served as a part-time Mormon missionary in Ann Arbor, Michigan.  He joined the faculty of BYA in 1895.  Shortly after this he served for a time as a missionary in Colorado.

From 1904 to 1909, Hinckley served as principal of Brigham Young High School.  He also served as counselor to George H. Brimhall and dean of the Church Teachers College.  He also was chief geologist at BYU.  After retiring from BYU in 1915 he served as superintendent of the state training school in Ogden.

Edwin and Adeline had 13 children.

After Hinckley's death his children established a scholarship in his honor at BYU.  Other scholarships were established in his honor at Weber State University, Utah State University and the University of Utah.  All these were also established by his children.

Sources
http://www.byhigh.org/Alumni_F_to_J/Hinckley/EdwinS.html
http://magazine.byu.edu/g/?act=view&a=1623
https://web.archive.org/web/20060913054932/http://alumni.byu.edu/Sections/NewsAndEvents/homecoming/esh_profile.cfm
Church News, August 24, 1996
Wilkinson, Ernest L. ed., Brigham Young University: The First 100 Years. (Provo: Brigham Young University Press, 1975) p. 768-770.

1868 births
Brigham Young University alumni
University of Michigan alumni
American Mormon missionaries in the United States
Brigham Young University faculty
American geologists
Hinckley family
1929 deaths
People from Millard County, Utah
19th-century Mormon missionaries
Latter Day Saints from Utah
Latter Day Saints from Michigan